Neuronal acetylcholine receptor subunit alpha-4, also known as nAChRα4, is a protein that in humans is encoded by the CHRNA4 gene. The protein encoded by this gene is a subunit of certain nicotinic acetylcholine receptors (nAChR).  Alpha4-containing nAChRs (specifically the alpha4beta2 subtype) appear to play a crucial role in the addictive response to nicotine..

The nicotinic acetylcholine receptors (nAChRs) are members of a superfamily of ligand-gated ion channels that mediate fast signal transmission at synapses. After binding acetylcholine, these pentameric receptors respond by undergoing an extensive change in conformation that affects all subunits and leads to opening of an ion-conducting channel across the plasma membrane. The protein encoded by this gene is an integral membrane receptor subunit that can interact with either nAChR beta-2 or nAChR beta-4 to form a functional receptor.

Mutations in this gene appear to account for a small proportion of the cases of nocturnal frontal lobe epilepsy. It has also been associated with a rare form of movement disorder characterised by dyskinesia during periods of exercise or activity called paroxysmal kinesogenic dyskinesia.

Interactive pathway map

See also
 Nicotinic acetylcholine receptor

References

Further reading

External links 
 
 

Nicotinic acetylcholine receptors